Love Finds Andy Hardy is a 1938 American romantic comedy film that tells the story of a teenage boy who becomes entangled with three different girls all at the same time. It stars Mickey Rooney, Lewis Stone, Fay Holden, Cecilia Parker, Judy Garland, Lana Turner, Ann Rutherford, Mary Howard and Gene Reynolds.

The screenplay was written by William Ludwig, from stories by Vivien R. Bretherton, and based upon characters created by Aurania Rouverol.  It was directed by George B. Seitz. In 2000, Love Finds Andy Hardy  was selected for preservation in the United States National Film Registry by the Library of Congress as being "culturally, historically, or aesthetically significant".

This was the first film in which Metro-Goldwyn-Mayer recorded at least part of the soundtrack in stereophonic sound, a practice which was used for a number of MGM musical comedies beginning the late 1930s. The film was presented in standard monaural sound.

Plot

It is December 1938 in the town of Carvel. Andy Hardy (Mickey Rooney) is putting a down payment on a used car, desperate to take his girlfriend Polly Benedict (Ann Rutherford) to the Christmas Eve dance in his own car. When Polly tells Andy she will be visiting her grandmother for the next three weeks and will not be able to attend the Christmas Eve dance with him, Andy vows to attend the dance alone. Judge Hardy (Lewis Stone), Andy’s father, later encounters his son, who broaches the subject of car ownership, but Judge Hardy tells Andy that he cannot have his own car.

Returning home for the evening, Judge Hardy runs into 12-year-old Betsy Booth (Judy Garland), who is staying with her grandparents for the Christmas holiday. Betsy’s grandmother has been effusive about Andy Hardy and Betsy is thrilled to learn he will be her next door neighbor during her stay. Judge Hardy’s wife, Emily (Fay Holden), receives a telegram that evening informing her that her mother has had a stroke. Emily and her sister leave immediately for rural Canada to care for their mother. Andy meets Betsy while delivering some of his mother’s freshly canned preserves. Betsy is obviously taken with Andy but he does not reciprocate her admiration; he leaves as quickly as possible.

Beezy (George P. Breakston), Andy’s friend, asks Andy to date Cynthia (Lana Turner), Beezy’s girlfriend, while Beezy is out of town over the Christmas holiday period, so that she will avoid other men. Beezy promises to pay Andy $8 plus 50 cents a week for expenses for his efforts. Andy needs the money to purchase his car, so he agrees. Andy starts going out with Cynthia, but she is bored by sports activities, and they find they only get along when they are busy kissing; after walking Cynthia home Andy stops in to visit Betsy Booth—only he’s covered in Cynthia’s lipstick. Betsy gives Andy a handsome new radiator cap for his anticipated car, and, after he leaves, she sadly sings “In-Between.”

One morning, Andy receives a telegram from Polly saying she will be home for the Christmas Eve dance after all. Andy telephones her saying he can’t take her to the dance because of a previous engagement. He thereafter opens a letter from Beezy. Beezy wrote saying he found a new girlfriend so he will not pay Andy for dating Cynthia. Betsy, from a moneyed family, offers to help Andy pay for his car, but he refuses her aid. That evening, he tells his father about the mess he made. Judge Hardy explains his point of view about spending money on a car versus putting it aside as savings—and then discloses his deep concern for Andy’s mother. Judge Hardy would like to convey a message to his wife, but there is no telephone at her mother’s home and Emily finds telegrams unnerving.

Andy suggests a message be sent to their mother via ham radio in lieu of sending her a telegram. Andy brings Judge Hardy to the home of twelve-year-old ham radio operator James McMann Jr. (Gene Reynolds) and he sends a message to Mrs. Hardy in Brigham, Quebec.  Judge Hardy is so impressed with James’s help and his son’s ingenuity that he pays the last $8 for Andy’s car.

Betsy deceives Cynthia into thinking that Andy’s car is an absolute wreck; Cynthia haughtily refuses to go to the Christmas Eve dance with Andy. Andy feels relieved to be able to date Polly again. Andy tries to clear things up with Polly but, having learned of his fling with Cynthia, she angrily tells Andy that she won’t go to the dance with him because she has a date with a college boy. Christmas Eve finds Andy wholly dejected at the prospect of not having a date for the dance—but when Betsy comes over in her evening gown he decides to take her to the dance.

At the dance, Polly’s date recognizes Betsy as an accomplished singer and asks her to perform; Andy is scared that she will embarrass him, but she proves to be a fantastic singer and quickly wins over the crowd with “It Never Rains But it Pours” and encores with “Meet the Beat of My Heart.” Betsy and Andy lead the dance in a grand march after Polly leaves in tears. Late that evening at home after the dance, Betsy Booth and the Hardy family are gathered together around the Christmas tree when Mrs. Hardy unexpectedly returns home—her mother is getting better.

On Christmas Day, Betsy explains everything to Polly. Polly and her date from the dance come over to the Hardy home, and Polly’s date turns out to be her cousin. Betsy expresses her gratitude to Andy for a wonderful evening and leaves. Polly and Andy make up.

Cast

 Mickey Rooney as Andy Hardy
 Lewis Stone as Judge James K. Hardy
 Fay Holden as Mrs. Emily Hardy
 Cecilia Parker as Marian Hardy
 Judy Garland as Betsy Booth
 Lana Turner as Cynthia Potter
 Ann Rutherford as Polly Benedict
 Mary Howard as Mrs. Mary Tompkins
 Gene Reynolds as James 'Jimmy' MacMahon Jr.
 Don Castle as Dennis Hunt
 Betty Ross Clarke as Aunt Millie Forrest
 Marie Blake as Augusta, the Cook
 George Breakston as Francis Bacon 'Beezy' Anderson
 Raymond Hatton as Peter Dugan
 Frank Darien as Mr. Barnes, Bill Collector

Production notes
 Production Dates: mid-May to mid-June 1938
 Love Finds Andy Hardy placed ninth in Film Daily's annual poll of the top films of 1938
 Mickey Rooney began to receive "star billing" in subsequent films due to his success in Love Finds Andy Hardy, and worked on this film simultaneously with Boys Town.

Reception
The film was a big hit, earning $1,637,000 in the US and Canada and $610,000 elsewhere, resulting in a profit of $1,345,000.

See also
 Andy Hardy
 List of Christmas films

References

External links 

Love Finds Andy Hardy essay  by Charlie Achuff on the National Film Registry website 

 
 
 
 Love Finds Andy Hardy essay by Daniel Eagan in America's Film Legacy: The Authoritative Guide to the Landmark Movies in the National Film Registry, A&C Black, 2010 , pages 276-278 

1938 films
1938 romantic comedy films
American Christmas comedy films
American romantic comedy films
American black-and-white films
Films directed by George B. Seitz
Metro-Goldwyn-Mayer films
United States National Film Registry films
Films with screenplays by William Ludwig
1930s Christmas films
1930s English-language films
1930s American films